Julian Riedel (born 10 August 1991) is a German professional footballer who plays as a defender for  club Waldhof Mannheim.

Career
Riedel came through Bayer Leverkusen's youth setup and made one appearance for the first team – he made his debut in a UEFA Europa League tie against Rosenborg in December 2012, and scored the decisive goal in a 1–0 win.

He signed for SC Preußen Münster in July 2013.

On 15 June 2022, Riedel signed with Waldhof Mannheim.

Career statistics

References

External links
 

Living people
1991 births
Association football midfielders
German footballers
Bayer 04 Leverkusen II players
Bayer 04 Leverkusen players
SC Preußen Münster players
FC Erzgebirge Aue players
FC Hansa Rostock players
SV Waldhof Mannheim players
2. Bundesliga players
3. Liga players
Sportspeople from Leverkusen
Footballers from North Rhine-Westphalia